Brigitte Friang (23 January 1924 – 6 March 2011) was a French journalist and writer.

Friang was born in Paris in 1924 and immediately after leaving school in Paris in 1943 joined the French resistance. Working in the same group as Colonel F. F. E. Yeo-Thomas, she was captured by the Gestapo, shot while trying to escape, then taken to Fresnes Prison and tortured, before being deported to Ravensbrück concentration camp.

After the war, Friang was liberated and returned to Paris where she worked for four years as a press aide to André Malraux, before becoming a journalist. In 1953, she was sent to French Indochina as a war correspondent. There she undertook parachute training and was dropped, in the opening hours of Operation Castor, into Điện Biên Province, in the north-west corner of Vietnam. She made several combat jumps including one with Lt Col Bigeard's 6th Colonial Paratroop Battalion at Tu-Le after which she accompanied the 6th on their retreat to French lines.  She survived the war and returned to Paris where she worked as a writer and journalist until her retirement.

On June 6, 1954 she appeared as a challenger on the TV panel show "What's My Line?" (the mystery guests for that episode were George Burns and Gracie Allen).

Friang died 6 March 2011 at the age of 87.

Published works

Notes and sources

 
 
 

1924 births
2011 deaths
Women war correspondents
French military personnel of World War II
People of the First Indochina War
French war correspondents
French Resistance members
French torture victims
Women in war in France
Women in World War II
French women writers
Women in warfare post-1945
20th-century French women